Khetag Aleksandrovich Pliev (born February 20, 1984) is a Russian professional boxer, freestyle wrestler and mixed martial artist who competed for Canada.

In 2012, Pliev was awarded the silver medal at the Marika tournament, qualifying him to compete at the 2012 Summer Olympics, where he came in 10th in the 96 kg weight category. He is a four-time Canadian National Champion, Ohio State champion (1999-2002), U.S. Junior open champion 2002. He had his professional boxing debut in 2017.

On April 1, 2021, Pliev’s finger became detached from his hand during an MMA bout. The finger was later recovered and reattached.

References

External links
 

1984 births
Living people
Canadian male sport wrestlers
Medalists at the 2011 Pan American Games
Olympic wrestlers of Canada
Pan American Games bronze medalists for Canada
Pan American Games medalists in wrestling
People from Alagirsky District
Wrestlers at the 2011 Pan American Games
Wrestlers at the 2012 Summer Olympics